Mekanique is a supervillainess in the fictional DC Universe. She first appeared in Infinity, Inc. #19 (June 1985).

Fictional character biography
In All-Star Squadron #58, Mekanique appears suddenly in the headquarters of the All-Star Squadron; she is badly damaged and attacks Firebrand. Before she can be destroyed by Green Lantern, Robotman steps in and offers to repair her. A subsequent power surge threatens to destroy the headquarters, but instead restores Mekanique. She reveals that she is from the far future, and had returned to the past to prevent a horrible future war. Mekanique shows the heroes an image of a child about to be killed in a car accident, and they save her, thus changing the future.

Afterwards, Mekanique reveals to Robotman her true origin. She is from the future, but was created by an evil scientist named Rotwang. In her time, a small elite ruled despotically over a downtrodden slave race. The elite were in danger of being overthrown due to a woman named Maria, who led the slaves into open rebellion. Mekanique had been given the power not only to travel in time, but to temporarily hold back the effects of the Crisis on Infinite Earths while she changed the future. Mekanique then erases Robotman's memory so that he cannot warn his fellow Squadron members.

In 1942 Mekanique meets Per Degaton while he is still an assistant at the Time Trust. She convinces Degaton to help her in her fight against the All-Star Squadron, in exchange for teaching him the secrets of time travel. Their attack fails, and Mekanique's body is destroyed. Degaton escapes with her head, and keeps it with him for the next five years. During that time, the two fall in love.

By 1947, Degaton, Mekanique, and a new ally, Professor Malachi Zee, have managed to build a working time machine. Degaton, who wants the machine for himself, shoots Zee, who falls into the machine and accidentally sends it forty years into the future. When Mekanique suggests they wait forty years for the machine to reappear, Degaton snaps and buries Mekanique's head. He becomes a founding member of the Injustice Society of the World after using Zee's technology to become an established member, but all the members are captured, and Degaton spends years in prison.

Forty years later, Degaton, now resigned to waiting for the time machine, reconstructs Mekanique. The two of them attack Infinity, Inc. at the scheduled return site of the time machine. When the time machine appears, it contains not only the body of Zee, but a younger Degaton. This duplicate version of Degaton had been created by the chronal energies of the time machine as Degaton had lunged at the machine in 1947. This Degaton disintegrates due to the paradoxical existence of two Degatons at once. Fearing that the young Degaton would destroy her again, Mekanique kills him, and then destroys herself.

Notes
 Mekanique's future world is the one of Fritz Lang's silent film Metropolis, and Mekanique herself the Maria-robot. This was possible, in part due to the fact that at the time of publication, "Metropolis" was a public domain film in the US and DC could, as such, use the film freely. However, for copyright reasons, Roy Thomas gave her a completely unique name rather than have characters refer to her as "Maschnenmensch". 
 Superman's Metropolis features another interpretation of Mekanique, called Futura.

References

DC Comics female supervillains
DC Comics robots
Earth-Two
Characters created by Roy Thomas
Characters created by Todd McFarlane
Comics characters introduced in 1986
Works based on Metropolis (1927 film)